Sinocurculigo is a monotypic genus of flowering plants belonging to the family Hypoxidaceae. The only species is Sinocurculigo taishanica.

Its native range is Southeastern China.

References

Hypoxidaceae
Monotypic Asparagales genera